The 9/11 Commission Report is a 2006 American drama film produced by The Asylum. It was written and directed by Leigh Scott, and was released in June 2006. The film stars Rhett Giles.

Cast
 Rhett Giles as  Mike 
 Jeff Denton as Jack 
 Eliza Swenson as Rosalind
 Sarah Lieving as Valerie 
 Marat Glazer as Yousef

Reception
Steve Anderson of Film Monthly and Film threat stated that the film "has quality, and in spades. The 9/11 Commission Report is a surprisingly clever piece of historical dramatization." And also said: "All in all, The 9/11 Commission Report'' is a stark, gripping, and ultimately chilling display of the events surrounding and leading up to the United States' single biggest non-natural catastrophe."

References

External links
 
 

2006 independent films
2006 films
2006 direct-to-video films
2006 drama films
American direct-to-video films
American disaster films
American drama films
2000s English-language films
Films based on the September 11 attacks
Films directed by Leigh Scott
The Asylum films
2000s American films